Maryada Ramanna is a 2010 Indian Telugu-language action comedy drama film co-written and directed by S. S. Rajamouli. The film is produced by Shobu Yarlagadda and Prasad Devineni under Arka Media Works. The film stars Sunil, Saloni and Nagineedu. It has music composed by M. M. Keeravani with cinematography and editing performed by Ram Prasad and Kotagiri Venkateswara Rao respectively.

When Rajamouli watched S.Narayan's 2002 comedy film Balagalittu Olage Baa, he liked it immensely and wanted to re-tell the same story in his own way. He tried to contact the original creators but found out that the original writers of the film were long dead and that the film's copyright had expired as it had been over 75 years since the film's release. S. S. Kanchi and Rajamouli had adapted that story with a Rayalaseema backdrop focusing on the factional violence and hospitality that co-existed in the region.

Released on 23 July 2010, the film opened to favourable reviews by critics. Made on a budget of 12–14 crore (US$2.6–3.1 million), the film was commercially successful collecting a distributor share of over 29 crore ($6.35 million). It became one of the highest grossing Telugu films of 2010. It received four Nandi Awards, including Best Popular Feature Film.

It was remade in various languages, namely - Maryade Ramanna (2011) in Kannada, Faande Poriya Boga Kaande Re (2011) in Bengali, Son of Sardaar (2012) in Hindi, Vallavanukku Pullum Aayudham (2014) in Tamil and Ivan Maryadaraman (2015) in Malayalam.

Plot
In 1982, Gandikota village of Rayalaseema region, a feud between two rival families results in the murder of Ramineedu's brother. He, along with his two sons Mallasuri and Baireddy, vow for revenge. 28 years later in Hyderabad, Ramu, an innocent man who lost both his parents, is ousted out of his job. He dreams of buying an autorickshaw for livelihood but is unable to finance it himself. Back in his native, Ramineedu uses his evil sons to murder a broker. One day, Ramu receives a legal notice that he is the inheritor of five acres of land in Gandikota. In the hope of selling the land, he sets off to the village on a train. On the journey, he meets Aparna, Ramineedu's daughter, and they become fond of each other. Ramu ends up in Ramineedu's house to seek his help to sell the land.

However, Ramu happens to be the son of Raghava Rao, the man who murdered Ramineedu's brother. Mallasuri informs Ramineedu about this and asks his permission to kill Ramu. But Ramineedu instructs that Ramu must not be killed as long as he is in their house, honouring their age-old traditions of not shedding the blood inside the house, thereby deciding to murder him as soon as he steps out of the house. Ramu is aghast when he overhears this and realizes that he'd be safe if he confines himself to the house. He pretends to be hit by a swing and takes rest for a day. Ramineedu and his sons realize that he is taking advantage of their tradition and are eager to get him out of the house. The following day happens to be death anniversary of Ramineedu's brother and all their relatives arrive. Ramu is afraid that he'd be killed as soon as everyone leaves. In a ploy to make everyone stay for longer, Ramu manipulates Valasanaidu to get his son Srikanth married to Aparna the same day. Ramineedu reluctantly agrees but Srikanth refuses. Ramu convinces Srikanth to marry Aparna by describing her attributes by which Aparna realizes her love for Ramu.

Meanwhile, Ramineedu announces that wedding would take place at the temple and everyone should go there. Aparna secretly meets Ramu and asks him to meet her at a mosque by escaping in one of the flowerbaskets. Mallasuri tries to secretly kill Ramu in the pent house but he cleverly escapes. As everyone leave to the temple, Bairreddy watches Ramu hiding in the flowerbaskets and plans to kill on the streets but fails to do so. Ramu stayed back in the empty house and finally runs away but Bairreddy and Mallasuri start chasing him. Srikanth, who realizes that Aparna is in love Ramu, tries to convince Ramineedu about their marriage. Furious Ramineedu decides to kill Ramu. Aparna meets Ramu to elope with him, only to realize that Ramu does not love her and was only trying to save his own life. Ramineedu and his sons find them at a wooden bridge. Aparna tries to stop his father but he is determined to kill Ramu as he dared to elope with his daughter. When Aparna says that she was the who loved him, Ramu realizes her love and surrenders himself. When they are about to kill him, she jumps into the river and Ramu saves her by jumping along. Ramineedu understands their love and lets them unite.

Cast

Production

Rajamouli wanted to re-tell the 1923 silent comedy film Our Hospitality in his own way. He later found out that the film's copyright had expired as it had been over 75 years since the film's release. His cousin S. S. Kanchi and him had adapted that story with a Rayalaseema backdrop focusing on the factional violence and hospitality that co-existed in the region.

The film was officially launched in June 2009 at Ramanaidu Studios in Hyderabad. Rajamouli said, "I decided that my next project would be Maryada Ramanna during Magadheera shooting itself because it is a one and a half years project that demands a lot of physical labour and mental strain. I didn't want to commit another physically exhausting film immediately after Magadheera. Maryada Ramanna gave us time to recharge our batteries so that we could come up with another huge project." He also revealed the film's plot on the film's launch to minimize the expectations of the audience because of Magadheera's success.

Soundtrack

The audio was released at a function held at Shilpakala Vedika, Hyderabad. The launch of the audio release was a webcast live on the internet, and it received a positive response from internet viewers globally.

Dasari Narayana Rao released the audio and handed over the first copy to K. Raghavendra Rao. The function was also attended by noted film fraternity like Junior NTR, Ravi Teja, Prakash Raj, V. V. Vinayak, Dil Raju, Prabhas, Sirivennela and other prominent cast and crew of the film. Meanwhile, music director M. M. Keeravani's birthday was also celebrated at a star-studded function.

Reception
The film received generally positive reviews from critics. Raghu Chaitanya from CNN-IBN said "The climax is perhaps the only drawback in the entire movie as the director opts to take the clichéd path of emotions and love. Sunil perfectly fits the bill as the innocent guy who comes back to sell his land and make money [...] SS Rajamouli emerges a winner showing that he can make good movies without huge budgets and big star cast." The Times of India gave a two and a half stars explained "Comedian Sunil, who turned hero with Andalaramudu a few years ago this time returns with another roaring comic flick and puts in a restrained performance. However, a well-designed set, great cinematography and mellifluous tunes by Keeravani takes this comic caper to a different plane."

Sify which gave a verdict as "Worth a watch" further noted "Sunil would no longer look like a comedy hero. His dances are simply superb, Saloni is beautiful and holds natural sex appeal. It is unfortunate that her talents remained undetected for the last three years, but for Rajamouli, now. She performed with perfection all through the movie. Definitely, she awaits a bright future hereafter, it seems. Maryada Ramanna has a judicious mix of fun, thrill and suspense." Rediff gave a three stars, commented Maryada Ramanna is thoroughly enjoyable. Rajamouli sure has a winner on his hands. Sunil is able to captivate the audience and Saloni looks pretty and is convincing too. Nagineedu portrays the role brilliantly. There are quite a few others like Brahmaji, Anuj Gurwara and Rao Ramesh who perform well."

Remakes
Maryada Ramanna was remade in several languages. Nagineedu reprised his role from the original film in the Tamil and Malayalam versions.

Box office
The film grossed  in its first weekend of release in the United States. Overall the film managed to gross over 40 crore ($8.75 million) with a distributors' share of over 29 crore ($6.35 million) and was amongst the top grossers of the year 2010.

Accolades
Nandi Awards
 Best Popular Feature Film Providing Wholesome Entertainment – Shobha Yarlagadda, Prasad Devineni
 Best Villain – V. Nagineedu
 Best Male Playback Singer – M. M. Keeravani for the song "Teluguammayi"
 Special Jury Award – Sunil

Notes

References

External links
 

2010 films
2010s Telugu-language films
Films scored by M. M. Keeravani
Sound film remakes of silent films
Telugu films remade in other languages
Films directed by S. S. Rajamouli
2010 action comedy films
2010 action films
2010 comedy films
2010s adventure comedy films
Indian action adventure films
Indian action comedy films
2010s action adventure films
Films shot in Andhra Pradesh
Films set in Andhra Pradesh